The 1933–34 Chicago Black Hawks season was the team's eighth season in the NHL, and they were coming off a disappointing 1932–33 season, as the Hawks finished in last place in the American Division and missed the playoffs.  Tommy Gorman was brought back to be the head coach of the Black Hawks, and while the team would score an NHL low 88 goals, they also allowed an NHL best 83 goals, and have a 20–17–11 record to finish in 2nd place in the American Division.  Goaltender Chuck Gardiner was named captain of the team for the season.

Paul Thompson would score a team leading 20 goals and 36 points, while Doc Romnes earned a club high 21 assists.  Johnny Gottselig would have a strong season, recording 16 goals and 30 points, while Lionel Conacher, acquired from the Montreal Maroons before the season began, would bolster the blueline, leading all defensemen with 23 points and had a club high 87 penalty minutes.

In goal, Chuck Gardiner would win his 2nd Vezina Trophy, as he helped the Black Hawks to a league low 83 goals against.  Gardiner would win 20 games, post 10 shutouts and set a club record with a 1.63 GAA.

The Hawks would face the Montreal Canadiens in the 1st round of the playoffs in a 2-game total goal series, and after winning the first game at the Montreal Forum by a 3–2 score, the Black Hawks would tie Montreal 1–1 in the 2nd game to win the series by a 4–3 score.  In the 2nd round, Chicago would face the other Montreal team, the Montreal Maroons, in another 2 game total goal series.  The Hawks would once again win the opening game, this time by a 3–0 score, and then Chicago would hold off the Maroons in the 2nd game, winning 3–2, to win the series by a 6–2 score, allowing the Hawks to advance to their 2nd Stanley Cup final in 3 years.  The Hawks would face the Detroit Red Wings in a best of 5 series, and the Black Hawks would take the first 2 games in Detroit, returning home needing only 1 win to clinch the Stanley Cup.  The Wings spoiled the party in game 3, beating the Black Hawks by a 5–2 victory, but the Black Hawks would come back, and win the 4th game 1–0 in double overtime to clinch their first ever Stanley Cup.

The Black Hawks Stanley Cup celebration would be cut short, when goaltender Chuck Gardiner would suffer from a brain hemorrhage, and died on June 13, 1934, due to brain surgery complications.

Season standings

Record vs. opponents

Schedule and results

Regular season

Playoffs

Chicago Black Hawks 4, Montreal Canadiens 3

Chicago Black Hawks 6, Montreal Maroons 2

Chicago Black Hawks 3, Detroit Red Wings 1

Player statistics

Scoring leaders

Goaltending

Playoff stats

Scoring leaders

Goaltending

References

 SHRP Sports
 The Internet Hockey Database
 National Hockey League Guide & Record Book 2007

Stanley Cup championship seasons
Chicago Blackhawks seasons
Chicago
Chicago